Cesina is an Italian surname. 

Cesina family has Roman-Lombard origins, members are present in some Italian regions in Campania, Lombardy, Emilia Romagna, Marche, Piedmont and Liguria.

See also
Cesina, is a toponym of Langobard or late Latin origin, used in southern Italy
Cesina Bermudes (1908–2001), a Portuguese obstetrician

References

Italian-language surnames